Don Heaton (April 29, 1931 – October 13, 2018), also known as Don Leo Jonathan, was an American-Canadian professional wrestler.

Professional wrestling career
Jonathan, nicknamed "The Mormon Giant" was a second generation star (his father was former wrestler Brother Jonathan) who made his professional wrestling debut after World War II. Over the course of his career, he competed around the world, making stops in Europe, South Africa, Australia and Japan; he wrestled more often, however, in the United States and Canada. His first championship wins occurred in Montreal with Canadian Athletic Promotions, where he twice captured their World Heavyweight title in 1955.

Elsewhere in Canada, Jonathan found more success competing in  Toronto's National Wrestling Alliance (NWA) affiliate Maple Leaf Wrestling (where he first teamed with Gene Kiniski to win the Canadian Open Tag Team title, in 1959) and in Winnipeg, where he wrestled for NWA member Alex Turk Promotions (twice winning their International Tag Team title) and for the American Wrestling Association. Jonathan also got a taste of World heavyweight gold again when he won the AWA-affiliated Omaha territory's version of the World title three times in 1961.

Canada eventually became home to Jonathan in the early 1960s as he settled in the Vancouver suburb of Langley. Making Vancouver his home base, he competed frequently for NWA All Star Wrestling, winning five Pacific Coast Heavyweight titles between 1970 and 1977, the NWA World Tag Team title (with Dominic Denucci) in 1966, and a record 18 Canadian Tag Team titles between 1964 and 1978, as well as challenging for the NWA World Heavyweight Championship against such titleholders as Kiniski, Dory Funk, Jr. and Jack Brisco; he also engaged in feuds with Kiniski and Dutch Savage in All Star, as well as teaming with them. On May 31, 1972, in what was billed as the "match of the century," Jonathan defeated Le Géant Jean Ferré (André the Giant) by disqualification. On September 7, 1972, in a match which was billed as the "Battle of the Giants" Jonathan had a rematch against André, this time losing by disqualification. In 1973 he wrestled in the WWWF and fought Pedro Morales for the championship as a heel. Late in his career, he appeared as one of the wrestlers in the 1978 Sylvester Stallone movie Paradise Alley.

Jonathan wrestled his final match, teaming with André the Giant and Roddy Piper to defeat The Sheepherders and Buddy Rose in Vancouver on March 10, 1980, before retiring from the ring that year. On November 5, 2005, he appeared at an event in Surrey, British Columbia, presented by Top Ranked Wrestling (prior to its purchase by NWA: Extreme Canadian Championship Wrestling) to be honored in a special ceremony for his contributions to the sport. On May 20, 2006, he was inducted into the Professional Wrestling Hall of Fame in Amsterdam, New York.

Personal life
Jonathan was born in Hurricane, Utah and raised as a Mormon. His father was professional wrestler Brother Jonathan DeLaun Heaton, a man known for bringing a pet rattlesnake, named Cold Chills, into the ring and reciting Bible verses as he wrestled, earning the nickname “The Salt Lake Rattlesnake.” He played high school football and learned martial arts. Before entering the world of professional wrestling, Jonathan was a sailor in the United States Navy.

He lived in Vancouver, British Columbia since 1963. He was married to a woman named Rose. After retiring from professional wrestling, he pursued a career in underwater inventions and exploration. He survived bladder cancer.

In July 2016, Jonathan was named part of a class action lawsuit filed against WWE which alleged that wrestlers incurred traumatic brain injuries during their tenure and that the company concealed the risks of injury.  The suit was litigated by attorney Konstantine Kyros, who has been involved in a number of other lawsuits against WWE. A month before his death, US District Judge Vanessa Lynne Bryant dismissed the lawsuit.

Jonathan entered a hospital in Langley at the end of August 2018 and died there on October 13, aged 87.

Championships and accomplishments
Alex Turk Promotions
NWA International Tag Team Championship (Winnipeg version) (2 times) – with Whipper Billy Watson (1) and Jim Hady (1)
American Wrestling Association
World Heavyweight Championship (Omaha) (3 times)
Catch Wrestling Association
CWA World Heavyweight Championship (1 time)
Cauliflower Alley Club
Iron Mike Mazurki Award (2007)
European Wrestling Union
EWU World Super Heavyweight Championship (1 time)
Grand Prix Wrestling
GPW Heavyweight Championship (1 time)
International Wrestling Association (Montreal)
IWA World Heavyweight Championship (2 times)
Maple Leaf Wrestling
NWA Canadian Open Tag Team Championship (1 time) – with Gene Kiniski
Midwest Wrestling Association (Ohio)
MWA American Tag Team Championship (1 time) – with Ray Stern
NWA All-Star Wrestling
NWA Canadian Tag Team Championship (Vancouver version) (18 times) – with Kinji Shibuya (1), Roy McClarty (1), Gene Kiniski (1), Jim Hady (1), Haystacks Calhoun (2), Dominic DeNucci (1), Rocky Johnson (1), Sky-Hi Jones (1), Paddy Barrett (1), Johnny Kostas (1), John Tolos (1), Duncan McTavish (1), Steven Little Bear (1), Jimmy Snuka (1), John Anson (1), Dutch Savage (1), and John Quinn (1)
NWA Pacific Coast Heavyweight Championship (Vancouver version) (5 times)
NWA World Tag Team Championship (Vancouver version) (1 time) – with Dominic DeNucci
Professional Wrestling Hall of Fame and Museum
Television Era (2006)
Southwest Sports
NWA Brass Knuckles Championship (Texas version) (1 time)
NWA Texas Heavyweight Championship (2 times)
Stampede Wrestling
NWA Canadian Heavyweight Championship (Calgary version) (2 times)
Stampede Wrestling Hall of Fame (Class of 1995)
World Championship Wrestling
IWA World Tag Team Championship (2 times) – with Antonio Pugliese
Worldwide Wrestling Associates
WWA International Television/United States Tag Team Championship (2 times) – with Fred Blassie (1) and Lord Leslie Carlton (1)
NWA "Beat the Champ" Television Championship (2 times)
Wrestling Observer Newsletter
Wrestling Observer Newsletter Hall of Fame (Class of 1996)

References

External links 
 
 Don Leo Jonathan honored by Top Ranked Wrestling
 Don Leo Jonathan interview at Dutch Savage.com
 

1931 births
2018 deaths
Latter Day Saints from Utah
American male professional wrestlers
American expatriate sportspeople in Canada
Canadian male professional wrestlers
People from Langley, British Columbia (city)
Professional wrestlers from British Columbia
Professional wrestlers from Utah
Professional Wrestling Hall of Fame and Museum
People from Hurricane, Utah
Military personnel from Utah
Stampede Wrestling alumni
20th-century professional wrestlers
NWA "Beat the Champ" Television Champions
WCWA Brass Knuckles Champions
NWA Canadian Open Tag Team Champions
NWA Canadian Heavyweight Champions (Calgary version)
IWA World Tag Team Champions (Australia)